Xunyang Subdistrict is a subdistrict of Taoyuan County in Hunan, China. The subdistrict was incorporated from a part of the former Zhangjiang Town in 2017. The subdistrict has 10 villages and 8 communities under its jurisdiction, its seat is at West Wuling Rd.()

Subdivisions

References

Taoyuan County
Subdistricts of Hunan